Robert Petrie (25 October 1874 – 1947) was a professional footballer who won the FA Cup with Sheffield Wednesday in 1896 and was on the losing side in the 1900 FA Cup final with Southampton.

Playing career
Born in Dundee, Petrie started his career in his native Scotland, before moving south to join Sheffield Wednesday in April 1894. In round 1 of the 1896 FA Cup, Petrie was part of the Wednesday team that narrowly defeated his future employers, Southampton, before going on to win the final in April.

After three seasons with Wednesday, Petrie moved to the south coast to join Southern League champions Southampton in May 1897, displacing John Hodgkinson. In his first season with the Saints, playing alongside Arthur Chadwick and Samuel Meston in the half-back line, he only missed two league games as Southampton claimed the Southern League title yet again. In 1897–98, Saints also reached the semi-final of the FA Cup before going out to Nottingham Forest in a replay (played in a blizzard).

Described in Holley & Chalk's The Alphabet of the Saints as "very much a team player, Bob was never showy but always reliable and at his best when the chips were down.". He did, however, have a drink problem and shortly after joining Southampton was reprimanded by the board over his drinking.

In the 1889–99 season, as a result of injury he lost his regular place to Scottish international John Robertson and only made nine appearances as Southampton, (now in their new home at The Dell), took the league title for the third consecutive season.

In the following season, Robertson having moved back to Scotland to join Rangers, Petrie resumed his place in the centre of the half-back line as Southampton took third place in the league, but reached the final of the FA Cup against Bury. Southampton were the first Southern League club to reach the FA Cup final, and had already beaten three top flight clubs on the way to the final but they failed to produce anything like their best form, conceding three goals in the first 20 minutes eventually losing 4–0.

Two days after the final, Petrie made his final appearance for the Saints in a 4–1 league victory over Bristol City, after which he was replaced by fellow-Scot Don Greenlees. In his three seasons with Southampton, he made a total of 68 appearances, scoring six goals.

In 1900 he moved to New Brighton Tower for their final season before the club was disbanded. He then returned to his native Scotland playing out his career for a variety of clubs, including three years with Arbroath and a spell with Brechin City just short of his 40th birthday.

Honours
Gainsborough Trinity
 Gainsborough News Charity Cup Winner: 1890
 Lincolnshire Football Association Challenge Cup Winner: 1890

Sheffield Wednesday
 FA Cup winner: 1896

Southampton
 FA Cup finalist: 1900
 Southern League championships: 1897–98 and 1898–99

References

External links
Dundee season 1893–94
Article in Dundee Evening Telegraph

1874 births
1947 deaths
Footballers from Dundee
Scottish footballers
Scottish Football League players
Southern Football League players
Dundee F.C. players
Dundee Wanderers F.C. players
Gainsborough Trinity F.C. players
Sheffield Wednesday F.C. players
Southampton F.C. players
Brechin City F.C. players
New Brighton Tower F.C. players
Arbroath F.C. players
Association football wing halves
FA Cup Final players
Dundee East End F.C. players